Russell is a crater on Mars, located in the Noachis quadrangle at 54.9° south latitude and 347.6° west longitude. It measures approximately 135 kilometers in diameter and was named after American astronomer Henry Norris Russell (1877–1957).

Description 

Debris flows have been observed on some of the dunes in this crater. Some researchers believe that they may be caused by liquid water. Liquid water could be stable for short periods of time in the summer in the southern hemisphere of Mars. These gully-like debris flows may be due to small amounts of ice melting. Another idea is that chunks of dry ice form on the dunes during the cold winter, then slide down in the spring when it is warmer. Experiments have demonstrated that carbon dioxide from the thawing dry ice forms a lubricating layer under pieces of dry ice, making it easy for the process to take place.

Gullies on dunes 

Gullies are found on some dunes. These are somewhat different from gullies in other places, like the walls of craters. Gullies on dunes seem to keep the same width for a long distance and often just end with a pit, instead of an apron. Many of these gullies are found on dunes in Russell (Martian crater).

See also 
 List of craters on Mars

References

External links 
 VEDIE et al., 2008 : Laboratory simulations of Martian gullies on the Russell crater sand dunes

Noachis quadrangle
Impact craters on Mars